Judith Flanagan Kennedy was the 56th mayor of Lynn, Massachusetts. She had previously served as a member of the Lynn School Committee from 1991 to 1997 and had been a councilor-at-large from 1997 to 2009. She launched a write-in campaign for mayor after the death of candidate Patrick J. McManus. She defeated incumbent Edward J. Clancy Jr. on November 3, 2009; 8,043 votes to 8,016. She was Lynn's first female mayor. In 2013 she was elected to a second, four-year term. She was defeated in the 2017 election by Democratic state senator Thomas M. McGee.

Election history

2009 Lynn Mayoral Election

Source: City of Lynn September 2009 primary voting results

Source: City of Lynn November 2009 voting results

References

External links

Mayors of Lynn, Massachusetts
Living people
Year of birth missing (living people)
Massachusetts city council members
Women mayors of places in Massachusetts
Massachusetts Republicans
21st-century American women